Coscaronia is a genus of bristle flies in the family Tachinidae. There are at least three described species in Coscaronia.

Species
These three species belong to the genus Coscaronia:
 Coscaronia antennalis Cortes, 1986 c g
 Coscaronia atrogonia Cortes, 1979 c g
 Coscaronia propinqua Cortes, 1979 c g
Data sources: i = ITIS, c = Catalogue of Life, g = GBIF, b = Bugguide.net

References

Further reading

External links

 
 

Tachinidae